Basel Evangelical School, also known as BEM School is a school situated at the Car Street locality in Mangalore city in the state of Karnataka in India. It was established in the year 1838 by the Basel Evangelical Mission. K. S. Hegde and Kayyar Kinhanna Rai have studied in this institution.

History 
Basel Evangelical School is one of the oldest educational institutes in South India, and in the year 2013, it had 480 students, from lower primary to the pre-university classes. Established in 1838 by German Christian missionaries, the high school section was added in 1888. It received permanent recognition from the Madras government in 1940. Since 1959, the school is managed by South Kanara Educational and Cultural Society. Ferdinand Kittel, the person who composed the Kannada-English dictionary, had taught in this institution.

References

High schools and secondary schools in Karnataka
Christian schools in Karnataka
Schools in Mangalore
Schools in Dakshina Kannada district
Educational institutions established in 1838